Curtis E. Gannon (born October 7, 1973) is currently a Deputy Solicitor General, a career position, in the Office of the  Solicitor General of the United States. He previously served as the Principal Deputy Assistant Attorney General for the Office of Legal Counsel of the United States Department of Justice. He was appointed to this position on 20 January 2017 by President Donald Trump.

Early life and education
Gannon graduated from Harvard University in 1994 and earned his master's degree at University of London, before earning a J.D. from the University of Chicago Law School (where he was an editor of the University of Chicago Law Review) in 1998.

Legal career
Prior to assuming office as acting head of the Office of Legal Counsel, Gannon was assistant to the Solicitor General. Before that, Gannon was in private practice at Gibson, Dunn & Crutcher. Gannon clerked for Supreme Court Justice Antonin Scalia during the 2004 Term, and Fifth Circuit Judge Edith Jones.

In 2014, Gannon argued the work shift case of Integrity Staffing Solutions, Inc. v. Busk on behalf of the Government. In oral argument, Justice Kagan posed a hypothetical to him: There was a federal judge in New York "ages ago . . . who had his clerks — all that they did was help him with his opinions and his cases and that was their principal activity — but had his clerks come early in order to cut his grapefruit and otherwise make breakfast for him." Is cutting grapefruit compensable? The identity of the judge whose clerks prepared grapefruit was later revealed as Edward Weinfeld of the U.S. District Court for the Southern District of New York.

On 27 January 2017, Gannon issued a memorandum approving the legality of Executive Order 13769, the controversial "refugee ban" limiting immigration from seven countries.

Upon the confirmation of Steven Engel on November 7, 2017, Gannon's tenure as Acting Assistant Attorney General concluded.   In August 2020, he returned to the Office of the Solicitor General as a career Deputy.

Gannon is a member of the American Law Institute.

See also 
 List of law clerks of the Supreme Court of the United States (Seat 9)

References

External links

1973 births
Living people
21st-century American lawyers
Alumni of the University of London
Harvard University alumni
Law clerks of the Supreme Court of the United States
Trump administration personnel
United States Assistant Attorneys General for the Office of Legal Counsel
United States Department of Justice lawyers
University of Chicago Law School alumni
People associated with Gibson Dunn